Lisa Raymond and Rennae Stubbs were the defending champions, but competed this year with different partners. Raymond teamed up with Lindsay Davenport and were eliminated in second round due to a withdrawal, while Stubbs teamed up with Elena Bovina and lost in first round.

Liezel Huber and Magdalena Maleeva won the title, defeating Shinobu Asagoe and Nana Miyagi 6–4, 3–6, 7–5 in the final. It was the 5th doubles title for Huber and the 3rd doubles title for Maleeva, in their respective careers.

Seeds

Draw

Finals

Top half

Bottom half

References
 Main and Qualifying Draws

2003 NASDAQ-100 Open
NASDAQ-100